Phoenix Tower may refer to:

Phoenix Tower (Houston), a skyscraper in Houston, Texas, United States
Phoenix Tower, Bucharest
Phoenix Tower, Chester, a tower in Chester, England
Phoenix Tower (horse) (born 2004), an American-bred, British-trained Thoroughbred racehorse

See also
Phoenix Towers, a skyscraper in Phoenix, Arizona, United States
Phoenix Towers (China), proposed skyscrapers in Wuhan, China